The 2019 Indonesia Open (officially known as the BLIBLI Indonesia Open 2019 for sponsorship reasons) was a BWF World Tour 1000 event which took place at the Istora Gelora Bung Karno in Jakarta, Indonesia, from 16 to 21 July 2019. It had a total purse of $1,250,000.

Tournament
The 2019 Indonesia Open was the fourteenth tournament of the 2019 BWF World Tour and also part of the Indonesia Open championships, which has been held since 1982. This tournament was organized by Badminton Association of Indonesia and sanctioned by the BWF.

Venue
This international tournament was held at the Istora Gelora Bung Karno in Jakarta, Indonesia.

Point distribution
Below is the point distribution table for each phase of the tournament based on the BWF points system for the BWF World Tour Super 1000 event.

Prize money
The total prize money for this year's tournament was US$1,250,000. Distribution of prize money was in accordance with BWF regulations.

Men's singles

Seeds

 Kento Momota (second round)
 Shi Yuqi (second round)
 Viktor Axelsen (withdrew)
 Chou Tien-chen (champion)
 Chen Long (second round)
 Jonatan Christie (quarter-finals)
 Anthony Sinisuka Ginting (second round)
 Srikanth Kidambi (second round)

Finals

Top half

Section 1

Section 2

Bottom half

Section 3

Section 4

Women's singles

Seeds

 Tai Tzu-ying (semi-finals)
 Chen Yufei (semi-finals)
 Nozomi Okuhara (quarter-finals)
 Akane Yamaguchi (champion)
 P. V. Sindhu (final)
 He Bingjiao (second round)
 Ratchanok Intanon (quarter-finals)
 Saina Nehwal (withdrew)

Finals

Top half

Section 1

Section 2

Bottom half

Section 3

Section 4

Men's doubles

Seeds

 Marcus Fernaldi Gideon / Kevin Sanjaya Sukamuljo (champions)
 Takeshi Kamura / Keigo Sonoda (second round)
 Li Junhui / Liu Yuchen (semi-finals)
 Mohammad Ahsan / Hendra Setiawan (final)
 Hiroyuki Endo / Yuta Watanabe (quarter-finals)
 Fajar Alfian / Muhammad Rian Ardianto (quarter-finals)
 Han Chengkai / Zhou Haodong (second round)
 Kim Astrup / Anders Skaarup Rasmussen (withdrew)

Finals

Top half

Section 1

Section 2

Bottom half

Section 3

Section 4

Women's doubles

Seeds

 Mayu Matsumoto / Wakana Nagahara (quarter-finals)
 Yuki Fukushima / Sayaka Hirota (champions)
 Misaki Matsutomo / Ayaka Takahashi (final)
 Chen Qingchen / Jia Yifan (semi-finals)
 Greysia Polii / Apriyani Rahayu (second round)
 Lee So-hee / Shin Seung-chan (semi-finals)
 Shiho Tanaka / Koharu Yonemoto (quarter-finals)
 Du Yue / Li Yinhui (quarter-finals)

Finals

Top half

Section 1

Section 2

Bottom half

Section 3

Section 4

Mixed doubles

Seeds

 Zheng Siwei / Huang Yaqiong (champions)
 Wang Yilyu / Huang Dongping (final)
 Yuta Watanabe / Arisa Higashino (first round)
 Dechapol Puavaranukroh / Sapsiree Taerattanachai (first round)
 Chan Peng Soon / Goh Liu Ying (semi-finals)
 Hafiz Faizal / Gloria Emanuelle Widjaja (second round)
 Praveen Jordan / Melati Daeva Oktavianti (first round)
 Tang Chun Man / Tse Ying Suet (second round)

Finals

Top half

Section 1

Section 2

Bottom half

Section 3

Section 4

References

External links
 Tournament Link

Indonesia Open (badminton)
Indonesia Open
Indonesia Open (badminton)
Indonesia Open (badminton)